Moja stvar is the fifth album by Croatian singer Severina. It was released in 1996 by Croatia Records. This is Severina's first album on which she is signed as the author of the title track and several other songs.

Track listing 
"Uspavanka" (Lullaby)
"Moja stvar" (My Business)
"Od rođendana do rođendana" (From Birthday to Birthday)
"Spreman za to" (Ready for It)
"Zima, ljeta, jeseni" (Winters, Summers, Autumns)
"Budi happy" (Be Happy)
"Slobodna" (Free)
"Aj, aj, aj, aj" (Ow, Ow, Ow, Ow)
"Milost" (Amazing Grace)

References

External links

1996 albums
Severina (singer) albums